Carthara is a genus of snout moths. It was described by Francis Walker in 1865 and is known from Colombia.

Species
 Carthara abrupta Zeller, 1881
 Carthara albicosta Walker, 1865

References

Epipaschiinae
Pyralidae genera